Conopholis is a small genus of flowering plants in the family Orobanchaceae.

Species
Conopholis alpina, alpine cancer-root
Conopholis alpina var. mexicana, Mexican cancer-root
Conopholis americana, American cancer-root or squawroot.  In the American Blue Ridge Mountains, C. americana is called "bear corn" because it resembles an ear of corn.

References

External links
USDA Plants Profile for Conopholis (cancer-root)

Orobanchaceae
Orobanchaceae genera
Taxa named by Karl Friedrich Wilhelm Wallroth